Henry Stanley Bennett, FBA (1889-1972) was an English literary historian.  Known as Stanley Bennett and publishing as H. S. Bennett, he was an authority on medieval England. He wrote Life on the English Manor (1937), and subsequently wrote extensively on literature of the fifteenth and sixteenth centuries.

Education and Family
Bennett was educated initially at St Mark's College in Chelsea, and upon graduation became a schoolmaster at a London elementary school. After being invalided during the final stages of the Great War, he returned to England and gained admission to study at Emmanuel College, Cambridge.

In 1920 Bennett married the literary critic Joan Frankau. Their son, Christopher S. Bennett, was a contemporary of the writer Simon Raven at King's College, Cambridge; he went into the Treasury, and disappeared (possibly intentionally, given a work dispute and his hosting of several parties prior to his departure) in September 1966 whilst on a walking tour of the Savoy Alps. Their daughter Margaret (born 1924) married in 1948 the librarian Philip Gaskell.

Bibliography
For a full bibliography see 

 The Pastons and their England, 1922
 England from Chaucer to Caxton, 1928
 Life on the English Manor, 1937
 The Author and his Public in the Fourteenth and Fifteenth Centuries, 1938
 Shakespeare's Audience, 1944
 Medieval Literature and the Modern Reader, 1945
 Chaucer and Fifteenth-Century Verse and Prose, Oxford, 1947 (part of "The Oxford History Of English Literature" series)
 English Books and Readers, volume 1, 1475 to 1557: Being a Study in the History of the Book Trade from Caxton to the Incorporation of the Stationers' Company, Cambridge University Press, 1952
 Six Medieval Men and Women, 1955
 English Books and Readers, volume 2, 1558 to 1603, 1965
 English Books and Readers, volume 3, 1603 to 1640, 1970

References

Alumni of Emmanuel College, Cambridge
1889 births
1972 deaths
Fellows of the British Academy
Frankau family